Diana E. Murphy (January 4, 1934 – May 16, 2018) was a United States circuit judge of the United States Court of Appeals for the Eighth Circuit and a former United States District Judge of the United States District Court for the District of Minnesota.

Education and career
Murphy was born in Faribault, Minnesota. She received a Bachelor of Arts degree from the University of Minnesota in 1954. She received a Juris Doctor from the University of Minnesota Law School in 1974. At law school she was an editor of the Minnesota Law Review. She was in private practice of law in Minneapolis, Minnesota, from 1974 to 1976. She was a judge on the Hennepin County Municipal Court, Minnesota from 1976 to 1978. She was a judge on the Minnesota District Court, Fourth Judicial District from 1978 to 1980. She was the Commission Chair of the United States Sentencing Commission from 1999 to 2004.

Federal judicial service
Murphy was nominated by President Jimmy Carter on November 30, 1979, to the United States District Court for the District of Minnesota, to a new seat created by 92 Stat. 1629. She was confirmed by the United States Senate on February 20, 1980, and received commission the same day. She served as Chief Judge from 1992 to 1994. Her service was terminated on October 13, 1994, due to elevation to the Eighth Circuit.

Murphy was nominated by President Bill Clinton on July 28, 1994, to a seat on the United States Court of Appeals for the Eighth Circuit vacated by Judge John R. Gibson. She was confirmed by the Senate on October 7, 1994, and received commission on October 11, 1994. Upon assuming office, Murphy became the first woman to serve on the Eighth Circuit.

Murphy took senior status on November 29, 2016. She died in her home in Minneapolis on May 16, 2018, shortly after announcing her full retirement from the bench. Later that year, the Minnesota Law Review hosted a memorial symposium in her honor, which included contributions from Justice Ruth Bader Ginsburg, Judge Michael Melloy, and Judge Rubén Castillo.

After her death, the United States federal courthouse in Minneapolis was renamed in her honor.

Attorney General consideration 
In 1993, she was reportedly considered for the post of Attorney General of the United States, which later went to Janet Reno.

References

Sources
 

1934 births
2018 deaths
20th-century American judges
Chairpersons of the United States Sentencing Commission
Judges of the United States Court of Appeals for the Eighth Circuit
Judges of the United States District Court for the District of Minnesota
Lawyers from Minneapolis
Minnesota state court judges
People from Faribault, Minnesota
United States court of appeals judges appointed by Bill Clinton
United States district court judges appointed by Jimmy Carter
University of Minnesota Law School alumni
20th-century American women judges
21st-century American women judges
21st-century American judges